Aaron Booth (born 1 October 1995) is an Australian professional rugby league footballer who plays as a  for the Gold Coast Titans in the NRL.

He previously played for the Melbourne Storm in the National Rugby League.

Background
Born in Sydney, Booth was raised in Brunswick Heads and played his junior rugby league for the Mullumbimby Giants.

He attended Palm Beach Currumbin State High School before being signed by the South Sydney Rabbitohs.

Playing career
In 2011, Booth played for Gold Coast Green in the Cyril Connell Cup. In 2012, he played for Gold Coast Green in the Mal Meninga Cup and later for Gold Coast White in 2013.

In 2014, Booth joined the Rabbitohs' Under-20 side, playing for 40 games for them over two seasons. In 2016, he played for the North Sydney Bears, the Rabbitohs' New South Wales Cup feeder club.

In 2017, Booth joined the Mackay Cutters in the Queensland Cup. He missed the entire 2018 season after tearing his ACL in pre-season training.

In 2019, Booth signed with the Easts Tigers, a feeder club for the Melbourne Storm. In November 2019, he joined Melbourne's NRL squad for pre-season training, earning a contract with the club.

Melbourne Storm: 2020-21
In Round 20 of the 2020 NRL season, Booth made his NRL debut for the Melbourne Storm against St. George Illawarra Dragons. He had his Melbourne jersey (cap number 208) presented to him by Melbourne Storm captain Cameron Smith.

Gold Coast Titans: 2022–
In August 2021 the Gold Coast Titans added Booth to their squad for 2022, with coach Justin Holbrook saying "Aaron is a local (Gold Coast) boy and it’s great that he is coming back to represent the region."

While with the Titans during the 2022 NRL season, Booth also played with Burleigh Bears in the 2022 Queensland Cup.

Booth made his Gold Coast debut in round 18 of the 2022 NRL season, starting at  against the Brisbane Broncos. He suffered a serious knee injury playing against Melbourne in round 21, with surgery required to repair a multi-ligament injury.

References

External links 
 Gold Coast Titans profile
 Queensland Rugby League profile
 18th man profile

1995 births
Living people
Australian rugby league players
Eastern Suburbs Tigers players
Mackay Cutters players
Melbourne Storm players
Gold Coast Titans players
North Sydney Bears NSW Cup players
Rugby league hookers
Rugby league players from Sydney